is a racing car driver, most famous for being the first Japanese driver to win the 24 Hours of Le Mans, in 1995.

Sekiya drove in single-seaters in his early career, contesting the Japanese Formula 3000 Championship and Formula Nippon from 1987 to 1993, mostly for the Leyton House team. He never achieved any victories, but finished 4th in the standings in 1988 and 1989, scoring three and four podiums, respectively.

A long-time works Toyota driver, Sekiya drove in the All Japan Sports Prototype Championship, All Japan Grand Touring Championship and Japanese Touring Car Championship, a series which he won in 1994, driving a Toyota Chaser for the Tom's team. He was also runner-up the following year.

As Sekiya is rather fond of Le Mans, in 1987, he got married in the town prior to the race. His best result in international sports car racing was winning the 1995 24 Hours of Le Mans, at the wheel of a McLaren F1 GTR for Kokusai Kaihatsu Racing. He became the first Japanese-born driver to win the 24 Hours of Le Mans. He was also fourth in the 1993 edition. He competed in the JGTC until the 2000 season and now works as team manager for the Super GT division of the Toyota Team TOM'S and also runs a racing school at Fuji Speedway. In 1998, Sekiya also appeared in a TV commercial in Japan driving a JZA80 Supra promoting its handling package.

Racing Record

24 Hours of Le Mans results

Japanese Formula 3000 Championship results
(key) (Races in bold indicate pole position) (Races in italics indicate fastest lap)

Complete JTCC results 
(key) (Races in bold indicate pole position) (Races in italics indicate fastest lap)

Complete JGTC results
(key) (Races in bold indicate pole position) (Races in italics indicate fastest lap)

Sources 
Masanori Sekiya at Driver Database
Japanese Sports Prototype Championship tables
Toyota Team TOM'S profile

1949 births
Living people
Japanese racing drivers
Japanese Formula Two Championship drivers
Japanese Formula 3000 Championship drivers
Japanese Touring Car Championship drivers
24 Hours of Le Mans drivers
24 Hours of Le Mans winning drivers
People from Shizuoka (city)
World Sportscar Championship drivers
24 Hours of Spa drivers

Long Distance Series drivers
TOM'S drivers
Team LeMans drivers
Japanese Sportscar Championship drivers
Team Joest drivers